Bhuteshwarnath (or Bhooteshwarnath) (भूतेश्वरनाथ महादेव) also known as Bhakurra Mahadeva (भाकुर्रा महादेव) is a temple of Lord Shiva, situated near Maroda Village of Gariaband district. It is in the middle of the Gariaband Forests. It is The Largest Natural Shivlinga (Lingam) in the world.

The Shivlinga is increasing in size, the devotees who visit here every year tell that the Shivlinga was small in size but now it's very huge. Government officials measure the size of Shivlinga every year.

Every year on Mahashivratri and on Mondays of Sawan month people with Holy Water from Mahanadi River, Rajim (Kanwar Yatra) arrives here. In Chhattisgarh like "Dwadas Jyotirling", it is recognized as "Ardhnarishwara Shivlinga".

Legends 
It is said that at the time of the Zamindari system hundreds of years ago, Shobha Singh zamindar, resident of Paragaon, Gariaband, had farming here.  When Shobha Singh used to go to his farm in the evening, he used to hear the sound of a bull from a special shape near the field, the sound of a bull screaming, and the lion roaring.  He told this to the villagers.  The villagers also heard the same voices in the evening.  The bull and the lion were searched, but due to the absence of any animal, the reverence of this mound increased.  People started considering this mound as Shivlinga.

References

External links
 Bhooteshwarnath Temple on Gariaband Tourism

Shiva temples in Chhattisgarh